A safeguard, in international law, is a restraint on international trade or economic development to protect communities from development aggression or home industries from foreign competition.

In the World Trade Organization (WTO), a member may take a safeguard action, such as restricting imports of a product temporarily to protect a domestic industry from an increase in imports causing or threatening to cause injury to domestic production.

In the United Nations Framework Convention on Climate Change, safeguards are intended to protect indigenous peoples and other local communities with traditional knowledge of natural resource management within efforts towards reducing emissions from deforestation and forest degradation.

The WTO and UNFCCC concepts are related within international law.

Background 
With UNFCC processes, safeguards became of concern in the 2010 United Nations Climate Change Conference.

Within the WTO, safeguard measures were available under the General Agreement on Tariffs and Trade (GATT) (Article XIX). However, they were infrequently used, and some governments preferred to protect their industries by "grey area" measures ("voluntary" export restraint arrangements on products such as cars, steel and semiconductors). As part of the WTO deal, members gave up the "grey area" measures and adopted a specific WTO Safeguards Agreement  to discipline the use of safeguard measures.

Safeguards are usually seen as responses to economic development and trade processes that align with international law, as opposed to negative practices, such as dumping or subsidies.

In the context of world trade, they are supposed to be used only in very specific circumstances, with compensation, and on a universal basis. For example, a member restricting imports for safeguard purposes would have to restrict imports from all other countries. However, exceptions to the nondiscriminatory rule are provided for in the Agreement on Safeguards itself as well as in some ad hoc agreements. In the last respect, it is worthwhile to note that the People's Republic of China accepted that discriminatory safeguards may be imposed on its exports to other WTO members until 2013.

Examples 

Some safeguard measures can be resorted to in the area of services, as provided for in the General Agreement on Trade in Services (GATS).

Regional trading arrangements have their own rules relating to safeguards. One example of a safeguard being used successfully was when Liechtenstein used a safeguard measure in the EEA Agreement with the European Union to limit immigration from the EU until a more permanent agreement was put in place to limit immigration.

Article 16 of the Northern Ireland Protocol is a more wide ranging safeguard measure affecting the relationship of Northern Ireland, the United Kingdom and the European Union after Brexit.

See also 
 World Trade Organization (WTO)
 United Nations Framework Convention on Climate Change (UNFCCC)
 IAEA safeguards (Supporting the Treaty on the Non-Proliferation of Nuclear Weapons)

References 

 Yong-Shik Lee (2014), Safeguard Measures in World Trade: The Legal Analysis, Edward Elgar
 Edwin Vermulst and Folkert Graafsma (2002), WTO Disputes Anti-Dumping, Subsidies and Safeguards, Cameron May
 Fabio Spadi (2002), "Discriminatory Safeguards in the Light of the Admission of the People's Republic of China to the World Trade Organization", Journal of International Economic Law 2002 5(2), 421-443. 
Paolo Farah (2006) Five Years of China’s WTO Membership. EU and US Perspectives about China’s Compliance with Transparency Commitments and the Transitional Review Mechanism, Legal Issues of Economic Integration, Kluwer Law International, Volume 33, Number 3, pp. 263–304.

External links 
 Technical Information on Safeguard Measures

International trade law